The , commonly known as the Sawamura Award, is an honor bestowed upon the top starting pitcher in Nippon Professional Baseball each year.

The award was originally established by Japanese magazine "Nekkyū" in 1947 to honor the career of Eiji Sawamura, a power pitcher who enjoyed an illustrious career for the Tokyo Giants before being killed in combat during World War II. It is a special award that is independent of the official Most Valuable Pitcher award that is presented to one pitcher in each league (Central and Pacific) each year.

Overview

Selection process 
One starting pitcher in Nippon Professional Baseball is chosen at the end of each season based on the following selection criteria.
 Games started: 25 or more
 Wins: 15 or more
 Complete games: 10 or more
 Winning percentage: .600 or higher
 Innings pitched: 200 or more
 Earned run average (ERA): 2.50 or lower
 Strikeouts: 150 or more

These simply serve as guidelines; while the pitcher who fulfills the most criteria has the most likelihood of winning, pitchers who do not fulfill all seven criteria have often been presented the award.

In the rare event that another pitcher has a season that is deemed more outstanding, a pitcher may, in turn, fulfill all seven criteria and not win the award. In , Hokkaido Nippon Ham Fighters starting pitcher Yu Darvish (16–4 win–loss record, 1.88 ERA, 208 strikeouts) fulfilled all seven criteria, but Tohoku Rakuten Golden Eagles starting pitcher Hisashi Iwakuma won the award despite meeting only six criteria because it was deemed that Iwakuma (21–4, 1.87 ERA, 159 strikeouts) had the better season overall.

The selection committee usually consists of five former pitchers.

Other notes 

The award has been presented to two pitchers in the same season twice.

Winners 
Bold names indicate pitchers who met all seven criteria (limited to 1982 and later winners)

See also 

 Nippon Professional Baseball#Awards
 Baseball awards#Japan
 List of Nippon Professional Baseball earned run average champions
Cy Young Award (MLB)
Choi Dong-won Award (KBO League)

References 

Nippon Professional Baseball trophies and awards
Awards established in 1947
1947 establishments in Japan